Coombe Junction Halt railway station serves the villages of Coombe and Lamellion near Liskeard, Cornwall, England, UK. It is situated on the Looe Valley Line and operated by Great Western Railway. All trains on this line have to reverse at Coombe Junction, but very few continue the short distance into the platform to allow passengers to alight or join the train.

History

The Liskeard and Looe Railway was opened on 27 December 1860 to carry goods traffic; passenger trains running from 11 September 1879.

The extension line from Coombe Junction up to Liskeard opened for goods traffic on 25 February 1901.  Passenger trains started to use this line on 15 May 1901 when Moorswater was closed to passengers. All trains called at what is now Coombe Junction station while the locomotive ran around to the south end of the train to continue the journey. The original track layout included a loop south of the station to allow two trains to pass, but from 1928 this was combined with the platform road and after this trains could only pass after the first had run round and shunted onto the through line, when the second could be allowed into the platform.

Naming
It is one of the only two stations in the National Rail Timetable to have the suffix 'halt' (the other being nearby ). The term 'halt' was removed from British Rail timetables and station signs and other official documents by 1974; the return of the term came only for these two stations in 2008 although Coombe Junction had not previously had the "halt" designation.

The station is rendered on tickets as 'Coombe Cornwall'.

Location

There is just a single platform, on the right of arriving trains, which can be accessed from the road at Lamellion, at the north end, or from a footpath running alongside the track from the level crossing to Coombe House, to the south.

Passenger trains have to reverse at Coombe Junction, but most do so without entering the station. The line continuing beyond the platform is no longer used, but runs to the now disused cement terminal at Moorswater, which lies just beyond the Moorswater Viaduct, carrying the Cornish Main Line across the valley.

Facilities 
Due to the rural location and limited service, the station has relatively few passenger facilities: only a basic shelter and a help point. It used to have a payphone inside the shelter, but this has since been removed due to damage.

Services
Coombe is served by just two trains a day in each direction Monday-Saturday. There is no Sunday service. The station used to get a more regular service in the 1960s.

Signal box

Coombe Junction signal box was situated on the west side of the line near the junction, but since 1981 the points have been worked by the guard of the train using two ground frames on the east side of the line. Number 1 Ground Frame is at the junction south of the station, and Number 2 Ground Frame is just north of the platform for the section to Moorswater.

Passenger volume 
With 26 passenger entries and exits between April 2014 and March 2015, it was the second-least used station in Great Britain that year, behind .

Community rail
The railway between Liskeard and Looe is designated as a community rail line and is supported by marketing provided by the Devon and Cornwall Rail Partnership.  The line is promoted under the "Looe Valley Line" name.

References

Bibliography

External links
Coombe Junction - Least Used Station in Cornwall 2017 YouTube video by Geoff Marshall about the station.

Railway stations in Cornwall
Former Liskeard and Looe Railway stations
Railway stations in Great Britain opened in 1896
Railway stations served by Great Western Railway
Low usage railway stations in the United Kingdom
DfT Category F2 stations